Lemonade (2006) is the second solo studio album released by G. Love and the seventh overall studio release including all G. Love and Special Sauce studio albums.

Track listing
 "Ride"  – 3:41
 "Ain't That Right"  – 3:51
 "Hot Cookin'"  – 3:41
 "Can't Go Back to Jersey"  – 4:06
 "Missing My Baby"  – 4:30
 "Holla!"  – 3:35
 "Banger" (featuring Blackalicious and Lateef the TruthSpeaker)  – 4:29
 "Thanks and Praise" (featuring Jasper)  – 4:03
 "Let the Music Play" (featuring Ben Harper & Marc Broussard)  – 3:28
 "Free"  – 3:12
 "Beautiful" (featuring Tristan Prettyman)  – 3:47
 "Rainbow" (featuring Jack Johnson)  – 3:11
 "Breakin' Up"  – 4:14
 "Still Hangin' Around" / "Sneakster" – 2:58 / 3:52

References

2006 albums
G. Love & Special Sauce albums